Georgi Lozanov  (born 3 March 1974) is a Bulgarian gymnast. He competed in eight events at the 1992 Summer Olympics.

References

1974 births
Living people
Bulgarian male artistic gymnasts
Olympic gymnasts of Bulgaria
Gymnasts at the 1992 Summer Olympics
Gymnasts from Sofia